Naimark's problem is a question in functional analysis asked by . It asks whether every C*-algebra that has only one irreducible -representation up to unitary equivalence is isomorphic to the -algebra of compact operators on some (not necessarily separable) Hilbert space.

The problem has been solved in the affirmative for special cases (specifically for separable and Type-I C*-algebras).  used the -Principle to construct a C*-algebra with  generators that serves as a counterexample to Naimark's Problem. More precisely, they showed that the existence of a counterexample generated by  elements is independent of the axioms of Zermelo–Fraenkel set theory and the Axiom of Choice.

Whether Naimark's problem itself is independent of  remains unknown.

See also
List of statements undecidable in 
Gelfand–Naimark Theorem

References

Conjectures
C*-algebras
Independence results
Unsolved problems in mathematics